The Beast Must Die (Spanish: La bestia debe morir) is a 1952 Argentine thriller film directed by Román Viñoly Barreto and starring Laura Hidalgo Guillermo Battaglia and Narciso Ibáñez Menta. It based on the 1938 novel The Beast Must Die by Irish writer Cecil Day-Lewis, part of his series featuring the private detective Nigel Strangeways.

Plot
A writer of murder novels adopts a new identity to track down the hit-and-run driver who killed his son. Along the way he falls in love with a beautiful film star, and a series of disastrous complications take their course.

Cast
 Narciso Ibáñez Menta as Felix Lane
 Laura Hidalgo as 	Linda Lawson
 Guillermo Battaglia as Jorge Rattery
 Milagros de la Vega as 	Sra. Rattery
 Nathán Pinzón as Carpax 
 Ernesto Bianco as Nigel Strangeways
 Beba Bidart as 	Rhoda Carpax
Josefa Goldar as Violeta Rattery
 Jesús Pampín as Inspector Blount
 Amalia Bernabé as 	Matilde
 Gloria Ferrandiz as 	Mujer de la cabaña
 Humberto Balado as Ronnie Hershey
 Ricardo Argemí as 	General Dixon 
 Eduardo Moyano as 	Martie Carter
 Warly Ceriani as 	Guilder
 Ángel Eleta as  	Bailarín
 Marcelo Lavalle as Assistante de filmación
 Rafael Salvatore as Hombre en bar

References

External links
 

1952 films
1950s Spanish-language films
Argentine black-and-white films
Films directed by Román Viñoly Barreto
Argentine thriller films
1950s thriller films
Films based on British novels
1950s Argentine films